The South American Youth Championship 1987 was held in Armenia, Manizales and Pereira, Colombia. It also served as qualification for the 1987 FIFA World Youth Championship.

Teams
The following teams entered the tournament:

 
 
 
 
  (host)

First round

Group A

Group B

Final round

Qualification to World Youth Championship
The two best performing teams qualified for the 1987 FIFA World Youth Championship.

 
  (host)

External links
Results by RSSSF

South American Youth Championship
1987 in Colombian football
1987 in multi-sport events
1987 in youth association football